Sliabh gCua–St Mary's GAA is a GAA club based between Dungarvan and Clonmel, County Waterford, Ireland. The club plays both hurling and Gaelic football. The club can trace its way back to 1927 but it was in 1970 that the present club Sliabh gCua–St Mary's GAA was formed. The club still uses two separate names depending on which sport they are playing. The name St Mary's is used as the name for its hurling teams, while its football teams still go under the name of Sliabh gCua. At underage, they are joined with Modeligo and are known as Naomh Brid. At U21 level, they are joined with a few other small local clubs Colligan and Kilgobinet, who play under the name Comeragh Gaels.

Club history
Late in 1969, a letter was forwarded to the then Curate of the parish of Touraneena and The Nire, Fr Brendan Crowley. In the letter from Gerry Cullinan as well as brother Tom and Ned Power who were all based in Dublin at the time, attention was drawn to the fact that there was a growing interest in forming a football club in Touraneena and he was asked to announce at mass that coming Sunday that a meeting would take place the following Tuesday with a view of forming a club.

Having a G.A.A. Club in the Touraneena area was nothing new. Down the years a number of different clubs were formed in the area but most were short lived and went out of existence as quickly as they were formed. In 1936 a former Sliabh gCua Club won the Junior Football County final, beating Fenor in the final after a replay. Twelve months previous, Sliabh gCua were beaten in the county final by the now defunct St Stephen's Club.
In times when there was no club in Touraneena, it did not deter local men form playing hurling and football, often lining out in the colours of another neighbouring parish. In the 1950s a number of players travelled to the Ring Club where they were part of a side that won a minor football county final. When a club was based in the Touraneena area the opposite happened as well, as players from local parishes who did not have a club in the area they played came to Touraneena to play.

Even after the formation of the present Sliabh gCua–St Mary's Club, enough players were not available to participate in the underage competition which began to be organised from the late 1960s and as a result they travelled to play with Fourmilewater, who with a number of Touraneena players in their colours won a minor hurling county final in 1973.

The present Sliabh gCua–St Mary's G.A.A. Club first competed in the various championships from 1970 and since then has won its fair share of championships in both hurling and football. The first twenty or so years of the club's history saw plenty of silverware make its way to the area between the Knockmealdown and Comeragh Mountains.
The first title came in 1972 when the western Junior Football Championship was annexed, but the locals had to give second best to Tramore in the County Final.

The period between 1978 and 1983 proved to be a glorious period for the club. St Mary's beat Ardmore in the 1978 Western Junior Hurling Final and went on to beat Rathgormack in the County decider. In Junior football Sliabh gCua reached the western final but were beaten by Ballinameela.

1979 proved to be an even better year. In Junior Football Sliabh gCua managed to capture the Junior Football championship in the west but had to give second best to Fenor by a small margin in the county final. In Intermediate Hurling St Mary's beat neighbours Fourmilewater in the Intermediate Western final winning by four points but in the county final went under to the same opposition by seven points.

1980 again saw Sliabh gCua win the Western Junior Football Final where for the second year in a row beat Stradbally in the final but went under to Roanmore in the county final. In Intermediate hurling Saint Mary's beat Dungarvan 2–16 to 3–10 in the county final.

Twelve months on, Sliabh gCua were again in the Junior Football Western Final and for the third year in a row beat Stradbally in the decider and made it third time lucky in a delayed County Final (Played in 1982) beat Tramore 1–10 to 0–4.
In 1983, St Mary's reached the Western Intermediate Hurling Final where they beat Tallow in the final at Cappoquin and went on to beat Ballygunner 2–7 to 1–9 in the County Final at Walsh Park.

During that time 1982 proved to be a momentous year in the club's history as it played both Senior Hurling and Senior Football, no mean achievement for a club of its size and with the resources available to it.

After the 1983 win against Ballygunner the Sliabh gCua/St Mary's had a number of lean years, not reaching any divisional or county finals until 1986 when they were beaten in the Intermediate Football Western Final against The Brickeys where they had to settle for second best. Twelve months on it was the same story in the same competition when they went under to Shamrock's in the Western Final. 1988 however proved to a bit better when they won the Western Final in Intermediate Football was captured but Gaultier proved to be too strong in the County Final.

1989 proved to be the club's best ever year. Sliabh gCua beat Affane to win the Western Intermediate Football Championship for the second year running and went on to beat Portlaw in the County Final. In Junior Hurling, St Mary's beat Ballinameela to win the Junior Hurling Western Final and then beat Ballydurn in the County Final. These wins helped secure the title Club of the Year in the county for the Sliabh gCua–St Mary's Club at the end of 1989.

In 1990, Sliabh gCua were relegated from the Senior Football ranks after just one year, but did prove to be strong enough to retain their status in the Intermediate Hurling ranks. However, not all was lost, as Sliabh gCua assisted by Modeligo won the County Under 21 'B' Football Final beating Erin's Own at Kill.

1991 saw Sliabh gCua prove to be too strong for all in the west in the Intermediate football Championship and it came as no surprise that they marched all the way to the county final where on a desperate day for anyone to play any outdoor sport, they beat Newtown to go back up to the Senior Ranks.

Since 1991, the Sliabh gCua–St Mary's Club had little to cheer about. In Football, the club retained its senior status for a number of years in the mid-1990s but were eventually relegated to the intermediate ranks once again. In Hurling St Mary's had a number of good years in the mid-1990s in the Intermediate hurling ranks, but lost the chance of contesting the latter stages of the championship on a number of years, late in the year and at times controversially.

The club retained its place in both the intermediate hurling and football championships until 2007 when St Mary's were relegated from the hurling championship. In 2008 the Western Junior Hurling Final was reached but St Mary's had to give way to a younger Modeligo team. In 2009, Sliabh gCua were relegated from the Intermediate football Championship. Two years later, Sliabh gCua beat An Sean Phobal to lift the Western Junior Football Championship with a team containing a nice mix of Youth and Experience and then went on to beat Mount Sion to win the County Final, so will be back playing Intermediate in 2012.

Like many other clubs in recent times emigration as robbed the club of some of its younger players in recent years who have had to move away in the search of employment. However, not all is lost as another group of young players are starting to come through, thanks mainly so some fantastic work put in at underage level. If these players can be brought on and retained locally, then the glory days of the late 70s and early 80s might return to the area in the not to distant future.

Underage
On Monday 20 January 1986, a new Juvenile G.A.A. Club was formed in Co. Waterford. For a number of years previous to this, both the Sliabh gCua/St Mary's G.A.A. Club and the Modeligo G.A.A. Club on their own were finding it increasingly difficult to field juvenile teams, so the obvious thing to do was for both clubs to come together, join what resources they had and form a new club.

At its first A.G.M. John Dalton was elected Chairman, David Fitzgerald was elected Secretary, Tommy Kenneally (R.I.P.) was elected treasurer and was assisted by Jerry Connors (R.I.P.), the clubs first P.R.O. was Nick O’Donovan and the priests living in Touraneena and Modeligo were made club patrons. In the early years of the club's history, the already named officers and those that succeeded them as well as the various selectors with the different teams did tremendous work in both hurling and football. People like Sean Whelan, Ned Ryan, Vince O’Donovan, Joe Coffey, Ned Power, Pat Hearne and Pat Troy amongst others were instrumental in the early success of the club.

In more recent years, a new group of coaches and administrators have got involved and they have continued the good work began by those who came before them.

Since the formation of the Naomh Brid club, despite small numbers to pick from, the club has been very successful, winning its fair share of divisional titles in both hurling and football. County Finals over the years have been hard to come bye but in recent times this has been put to right. Naomh Brid has also produced a number of very good players that have played for Waterford in different grades of hurling and football at all levels.

In its first year, Naomh Brid contested an under 16 hurling western final but had to settle for second best. Twelve months on, using the Sliabh gCua name, a Sliabh gCua and Modeligo combination won an under 21 western final but defeat was the team's lot in the County Minor final suffering against Rathgormack. The years between 1988 and 1992 were very successful years for the Naomh Brid Club.

1988 saw the club win its first ever under 12 hurling championship. 1989 saw the club put together a very good under 16 football team, a team that won a western football title but missed out on the county title. In hurling the Naomh Brid's under 16 team qualified for the western final in 1990 but again had to settle for second best. In minor football Naomh Brid won the 1990 minor 'B' western football and went on to play a Mount Sion side that included Tony Browne in the final. The city side needed two attempts to defeat Naomh Brid. A side from Touraneena and Modeligo using the Sliabh gCua name, won the 'B' under 21 football championship in the west of the county and went on to beat Erin's Own in the county final at Kill. This was a first county final win for the combined Sliabh gCua/St. Mary's and Modeligo G.A.A. Clubs since they joined forces in 1986.

In 1991 Naomh Brid, having produced a good under 16-football team in 1989 and a good minor football team in 1990, regrouped and put in a terrific effort during the course of the year to win a western final. The side went on to play Portlaw in Fraher Field. Naomh Brid ran out winners to record a first ever-county final win for the Naomh Brid Club. In 1992 the club won an under 14 football and under 16 hurling championship but had to settle for second best to their opponents in both County Finals.

In 1994 Naomh Brid won a western minor hurling title but was defeated in the county final at the hands of a strong Passage side at Cappoquin. 1994 saw the club run its first mixed league for the younger children in the area. Both boys and girls from the parishes of Touraneena and Modeligo were invited to Kirwan Park each week to take part in mixed leagues over the course of a few weeks in the summer. These leagues ran for three years and it was no major surprise that the standard of football improved each week.

Between 1994 and 1997 Naomh Brid qualified for four under 12-football titles. It was no coincidence that these mixed leagues played their part in preparing the teams for the championships, which began around the same time the leagues, were being run. In 1994, Naomh Brid qualified to play Dungarvan in the final at Cappoquin but the final was never played.

1995 was a great year for the club. Using mostly the team that qualified for the 1994 final, the under 12-football team reached the 'A' final against Kilgobinet. This game was played at the Club Grounds in Dungarvan. Naomh Brid came out on top winning 3–3 to 2–1. This was Naomh Brid's first ever win in an 'A' grade competition. The club also had a very good under 16 panel of players in 1995. In hurling and football, the club reached both divisional finals. In hurling Naomh Brid took on St Mary's (East) in the county final at the Ballyduff Lower G.A.A. Club Grounds. On the night Naomh Brid were defeated 1–13 to 1–12. Of Naomh Brid's total of 1–12 on the night, Pat Fitzgerald got 1–10. In football, St Mollerans provided the opposition for Naomh Brid at Fraher field but like in the hurling, Naomh Brid had to settle for second best. In 1996, Naomh Brid qualified for a third successive under 12 final. Just like twelve months previously, Kilgobinet were to provide the opposition and again, Naomh Brid came out on top in this game.

In 1997 for the fourth successive year, Naomh Brid qualified for a western under 12-football final. This time, Cappoquin again was the venue for the final and St. Oliver's provided the opposition. Naomh Brid ran out victors in this game. The under 16 hurling team were also reach a western final which doubled up as a county final as in the east of the county at the time they did not play 'C' grade competitions in hurling. Ballyduff provided the opposition for Naomh Brid in the final and they needed two attempts to overcome Naomh Brid. Naomh Brid and Stradbally renewed rivalry at under 16 level in 1998 when the two sides clashed in a western final football final at Lemybrien. Naomh Brid were to win by a narrow margin but were to be outclassed in the county final by St Mary's. The clubs under 16 hurling team also reached a western final but had to play second best to An Gaeltacht.

The club over the next few years was to go through a few lean years. A number of players for different reasons decided to give up playing hurling and football and a number of people who were administrators or selectors with the club for a number of years decided also to call it a day. A number of new people had to be found to get involved in the club, and it took these people a few years to get their ideas and visions for the club in place. The club struggled for a few years to field teams particularly at under 16, minor and under 21 level.

However it was not all doom and gloom, as the club contested both an under 14 and 16 hurling county final against Clashmore in 1999 and 2000 and a western under 12 hurling final in 2000 but had to settle for second best on each occasions. An under 16 hurling championship in the west of the county was won in 2001, when Naomh Brid beat An Gaeltacht at Bushy Park. In 2002, Naomh Brid won an under 11 ground hurling western final but were beaten by Passage in the county final.

At this time, the Kilgobinet/Colligan Minor Club having changed its name from St Patrick's in the mid-1990s were also having trouble in fielding juvenile teams as were Naomh Brid. The logic thing for both sides was to sit down and talk to each other about putting joining up and entering teams together into the various underage competitions fielding players as close to the upper age limit as is possible on each team.

For the 2003 championships it was agreed that Naomh Brid would assist Kilgobinet/Colligan in hurling and be known as St. Patrick's and in football Naomh Brid would be assisted by Kilgobinet/Colligan and that for 2004 competitions the name of Naomh Brid would be used in hurling competitions and St Patrick's in football.

Over the last few years, Naomh Brid and St. Patrick's assisting each other has worked well with the clubs winning at least one county final each year. In 2003, St. Patrick's reached a western division three under 14 hurling final but were beaten by Ballyduff in Lismore. A few weeks later the same two sides met in the county division four hurling final at Cappoquin. This time it was St. Patrick's who came out on top with Eanna Power playing a blinder for St. Patrick's in goal. Naomh Brid won a western under 12-football title during 2003, defeating The Nire in the final at Cappoquin, and in hurling St. Patrick's were defeated in a Western Final against Clashmore after a replay at Bushy Park.

In 2004, St. Patrick's reached an under 14 western final against Kilrossanty but had to settle for second best. In the same year, Naomh Brid put in a terrific effort to defeat St. Olivers in an under 12 hurling western final. In 2004 county finals played at under 12 level for the first time. After defeating St. Olivers, Naomh Brid took on Passage in the County Final. The game ended in a draw and after the replay, Naomh Brid came out on top. This was a first ever hurling county final win for Naomh Brid and a first juvenile County Final win for Naomh Brid. (Juvenile in G.A.A. terms in Waterford is 16 and under).

2005 saw Naomh Brid reach an under 12 western final against St Oliver's. The game ended in a draw. The replay took place at a few days later. It looked as if the game was heading to extra time until Conor Skehan popped up to score 1–1 in the last few minutes of the game to snatch victory for Naomh Brid. Ferrybank provided the opposition for Naomh Brid in the county final. Ferrybank were expected to provide stiff opposition for Naomh Brid in this game. On the day, Naomh Brid were brilliant. From the off every one of the Naomh Brid players gave it his all. Everything that Ferrybank threw at the Naomh Brid team they were able to cope with. Even when reduced to fourteen players early in the second half did not deter the Naomh Brid players. Every one of the other players dug even deeper. In the end, Naomh Brid ran out deserved winners.

In 2006 St Patrick's defeated Kilrossanty to win the Western Final at under 16 level in football. They went on to take on Ferrybank in the County Final. In a low scoring game, St Patrick's ran out winners. Naomh Brid were defeated by Fourmilewater in a brilliant county under 16 hurling final and at the time of putting this piece together Naomh Brid are awaiting a date for the final of the under 16 hurling Western Championship. In under 11, Naomh Brid defeated An Gaeltacht to win a ground hurling western final but had to play second best to St Saviours.

In under 14 hurling, Naomh Brid played Cois Bhride in a division two western final at Cappoquin. Cois Bride had a very good team and ran out winners. Naomh Brid also reached the semi finals of the county championships. In both under 12 and 14 football St. Patrick's were defeated at the semi final stages in both competitions. At minor level both Naomh Brid and St. Patrick's competed in both the hurling and football championships.

A lot has been achieved in the years since the Naomh Brid club was formed in January 1986. In the next few years, with hard work, determination and co-operation from everyone, a great deal more success will follow in the next few years.

Honours won by Naomh Brid G.A.A. Club

 West Waterford Under 12 Hurling Championship 	1988, 2004, 2010
 West Waterford Under 13 Hurling Championship 	2012, 
 West Waterford Under 16 Football Championship 	1989, 1995, 1998
 West Waterford Minor Hurling Championship	1990, 1994
 West Waterford Minor Football Championship 	1990, 1991
 Waterford Minor Football Championships: 1991 (B)
 West Waterford Under 14 Football Championship 	1992
 West Waterford Under 16 Hurling Championship 	1994, 1995, 2001, 2006
 West Waterford Under 12 Football Championship 	1995(A), 1996(C), 1997, 2002, 2005
 West Waterford Under 11 Ground Hurling Championship      2002, 2006, 2007
 Waterford Under 12 Hurling Championship	2004, 2010
 Waterford Under 12 Football Championship	2005

Adult honours
 Waterford Senior Hurling Championships: 0
 Waterford Senior Football Championships: 0
 Waterford Intermediate Hurling Championships: (2)
 1980 & 1983
 Waterford Intermediate Football Championships: (2)
 1989 & 1991
 Waterford Junior Hurling Championships: (2)
 1978 & 1989
 West Waterford Junior Hurling Championships: (4)
 1979, 1989, 2015, 2016, 
 West Waterford Junior Football Championships: (6)
 1936, 1972, 1979, 1980, 1981, 2011, 2017 
 Waterford Junior Football Championships: (4)
 1936, 1981, 2011, 2017
 Waterford Under-21 Football Championships: 1
 1990 (B)
 Waterford GAA Club of the Years: (1)
 1989 
 Waterford GAA Special Achievement Awards: (1)
 2011

See also
 Sliabh gCua
 Ballinamult
 Comeragh Gaels
 Touraneena

External links
 Club Website

Gaelic games clubs in County Waterford
Hurling clubs in County Waterford